The Newport Tower (also known as Newport Office Center II and 525 Washington Boulevard) in Newport, Jersey City, New Jersey is the seventh tallest building in Jersey City, and eighth tallest in New Jersey. It has 37 floors, is 531 ft (162 m) tall, and is connected to a mall (called the Newport Centre Mall) within the complex. The mall is one of the few enclosed, regional shopping facilities in Hudson County. The building was developed by Melvin Simon & Associates in 1990. The Newport Tower is next to the Hudson River and is almost exactly across the river from the World Financial Center in Manhattan. The Newport Tower is a modern-style building. It is similar in appearance to the Willis Tower, (formerly known as Sears Tower) in Chicago, Illinois.

The tower received a facelift in the summer of 2005; wooden panels have been installed on the lobby walls, and LCD advertisement screens added to the elevators. The colonnade in front of the building has been removed in July 2008. A new elevator management system, Schindler ID, was installed in the building in September 2009.

On October 19, 2011, Multi-Employer Property Trust purchased the Newport Tower from Brookfield Properties for $377.5 million. Brookfield Properties took ownership of the Newport Tower in June 2006 after the $4.8 billion acquisition of Trizec Properties.

See also
List of tallest buildings in Jersey City

References

External links

Skyscrapers in Jersey City, New Jersey
Skyscraper office buildings in Jersey City, New Jersey
Brookfield Properties buildings
Office buildings completed in 1991